Jack Hunter (5 October 1914 – 21 September 1990) was an Australian rules footballer who played with Essendon and North Melbourne in the Victorian Football League (VFL).

Notes

External links 
		

1914 births
1990 deaths
Australian rules footballers from Victoria (Australia)
Essendon Football Club players
North Melbourne Football Club players
South Bendigo Football Club players